Ectonucleoside triphosphate diphosphohydrolase 3 is an enzyme that in humans is encoded by the ENTPD3 gene.

ENTPD3 is similar to E-type nucleotidases (NTPases). NTPases, such as CD39, mediate catabolism of extracellular nucleotides. ENTPD3 contains 4 apyrase-conserved regions which is characteristic of NTPases.

References

Further reading